The 50th edition of the Vuelta a Colombia was held from June 11 to June 26, 2000.

Stages

2000-06-11: Circuito Cartagena (108 km)

2000-06-12: Cartagena — Barranquilla (141.9 km)

2000-06-13: Puerto Giraldo — Sincelejo (174.9 km)

2000-06-14: Sincelejo — Montería (121.1 km)

2000-06-15: Caucasia — Yarumal (164 km)

2000-06-16: Yarumal — Medellín (136.2 km)

2000-06-17: Medellín — Medellín (25.2 km)

2000-06-18: Oriente — Oriente (152.9 km)

2000-06-19: Caldas — Manizales (196 km)

2000-06-20: Cartago — Cali (184.6 km)

2000-06-21: Palmira — Pereira (222 km)

2000-06-22: Pereira — Ibagué (125 km)

2000-06-23: Ibagué — Soacha (181 km)

2000-06-24: Chía — Villa de Leyva (157.2 km)

2000-06-25: Villa de Leyva — Tunja (36.6 km)

2000-06-26: Paipa — Bogotá (184.2 km)

Final classification

Teams 

Aguardiente Cristal — Chec

05 Orbitel

Selle Italia — Néctar

Selección de Cuba

Selección de Ecuador

Aguardiente Antioqueño — Lotería de Medellín

Lotería de Boyacá

Aguardiente Néctar — Selle — Aguila Roja

Ciclistas de Jesucristo

Ron Boyacá-Esmopar — Alcaldías Norte Boyacá

Club Cicloases

Panamericanos Bucaramanga 2000

Mixto Federación — Tolima — Huila

See also 
 2000 Clásico RCN

References 
 cyclingnews
 pedalesybielas (Archived 2009-10-22)

Vuelta a Colombia
Colombia
Vuelta Colombia